Oral Surgery, Oral Medicine, Oral Pathology, and Oral Radiology is a monthly peer-reviewed medical journal that covers research in oral surgery, medicine, pathology, radiology, and endodontics published by Mosby. It was originally established as Oral Surgery, Oral Medicine, and Oral Pathology in 1948, changing its name to Oral Surgery, Oral Medicine, Oral Pathology, Oral Radiology, and Endodontology in 1995, and acquiring its current name in 2012. It is an official journal of the American College of Oral and Maxillofacial Surgery, American Academy of Oral and Maxillofacial Radiology, American Academy of Oral Medicine, and the American Academy of Oral and Maxillofacial Pathology. According to the Journal Citation Reports, the journal has a 2020 impact factor of 2.589.

References

External links 
 

Dentistry journals
Radiology and medical imaging journals
Monthly journals
Mosby academic journals
Publications established in 1948
English-language journals
Academic journals associated with learned and professional societies of the United States